Animaná is a town and rural municipality in Salta Province in northwestern Argentina.  At the 2001 census, the town had 1454 residents. Animaná means "sky place" in the Cacán language.

Animaná is located on National Route 40 south of San Carlos towards Cafayate. It is set in a picturesque area of Calchaquí Valley where there are many vineyards.

The local economy is dominated by the wine industry, with many vineyards and wineries located nearby.  Animaná is also known for its weaving and its pottery.

The town's fiesta patronal, honoring the Virgin of Mercy, is celebrated September 24.

References

Populated places in Salta Province